The All Nepal Trade Union Congress (ANTUC) was formed in 1946 and was the first trade union to ever exist in Nepal. The union was formed by a mixture of communists and socialists, the latter group leaving in 1950 to form the Nepal Workers Union (Majdoor Sabha), however they received little support. 

In 1947, the Biratnagar Workers Union (BWU) was formed and although this was initially seen as a threat to the ANTUC, the union was reorganised in 1950 and in 1951 merged with the BWU. The ANTUC served as the primary body representing Nepalese workers until 1960 when the Panchayat system was implemented and unions banned. 

In 1979, unions were once again legalised but by this time ANTUC had disintegrated to be overtaken by the Nepal Independent Workers Union amongst others.

Notes and references 

National trade union centers of Nepal
Trade unions established in 1946
Trade unions disestablished in 1960
1946 establishments in Nepal